Viktor Rosenzweig (1914–1941) was a Croatian-Jewish communist, poet and writer.

Rosenzweig was born in Ruma in 1914. During high school education he became a member of the Young Communist League of Yugoslavia - SKOJ (from Serbo-Croatian: Savez komunističke omladine Jugoslavije). Rosenzweig studied and graduated from the Faculty of Agriculture at University of Zagreb. At the university he was one of the most observed and noticed Marxist around. In 1934, he became a member of the Communist Party of Yugoslavia. In 1935, as a communist, he was sentenced to six months in prison. Rosenweig was a poet who wrote number of poems. Some of his poets were later published in a revolutionary writers collection "Riječi i Djela" (Words and Acts). In April 1941, after Independent State of Croatia establishment, Rosenzweig was arrested and imprisoned at Savska cesta prison. On July 9, 1941 Rosenzweig was killed by Ustaše together with Božidar Adžija, Otokar Keršovani, Ognjen Prica and Zvonimir Richtmann.

Published works
 Naš život, Orbis Zagreb, 1939

References

Bibliography 

 
 

1914 births
1941 deaths
People from Ruma
Croatian Jews
Austro-Hungarian Jews
Croatian Austro-Hungarians
Croatian people of Serbian-Jewish descent
Croatian communists
Croatian male poets
Croatian civilians killed in World War II
Deaths by firearm in Croatia
Faculty of Agriculture, University of Zagreb alumni
Jewish socialists
20th-century Croatian poets
Croatian Marxists
People executed by the Independent State of Croatia